The Mannheim Centre for European Social Research (MZES) is an interdisciplinary research institute of the University of Mannheim, founded in 1989. It is located in the square A5 of the city of Mannheim nearby the Mannheim Palace.

The institute devotes itself to research on societal and political developments in Europe. Research focus is located in comparative research on Europe and the investigation of the European integration. The MZES mainly carries out basic research, financed by external funds from the German national research foundation (Deutsche Forschungsgemeinschaft), foundations promoting scientific research, and research funds from the European Union. Furthermore, the MZES, closely related to the School of Social Sciences of the University of Mannheim, gives training and support to young social scientists, when starting their scientific careers. At present, approximately 80 social scientists and 60 students are working at the MZES. Thus, the MZES is the largest institute of the University of Mannheim, and the largest research institute of a German university in the field of the social sciences.

From 1989–1998 the institute was composed of four work units:
 I Social structure and the Welfare State
 II Elections and Policy Research
 III Political and Social Integration
 IV German Democratic Republic / East Europe (1992 to 1998)

In 1999, these four work units were reduced to two research departments:
 Research Department A, The European Societies and their Integration: since December 2021 directed by the sociologist Marc Helbling.
 Research Department B, The European Political Systems and their Integration: since February 2022 directed by the political scientist Thomas Bräuninger.

The director and the heads of the research departments together form the executive board of the institute. The activity of the executive board and the institute is controlled by a supervisory board. The institute's research program is outlined for three years and evaluated by an international scientific advisory board. An annual report informs about the institute's activity.

Directors 
The director is elected by the supervisory board for a period of three years.
 Peter Flora 1989–1992 founding director, sociology
 Franz Urban Pappi 1993–1995, political science
 Peter Flora 1996–1998, sociology
 Jan W. van Deth 1999–2001, political science
 Walter Müller 2002–2004, sociology
 Wolfgang C. Müller 2005–2007, political science
 Bernhard Ebbinghaus 2008–2011, sociology
 Rüdiger Schmitt-Beck 2011-2014, political science
 Frank Kalter 2014-2017, sociology
 Marc Debus 2017-2020, political science
 Irena Kogan 2020-2023, sociology
 Sabine Carey 2023-, political science

A managing director supports the director in his/her work. This position was held from 1989–1997 by Andreas Weber, and from 1998–2009 by Reinhart Schneider. Since 2010 Philipp Heldmann is managing director of the institute.

External links 
 English website of the MZES

University of Mannheim
Research institutes in Germany
Social science institutes
1989 establishments in West Germany
Research institutes established in 1989